Battulgyn Mönkhtuyaa (born 18 February 1988) is a Mongolian judoka.

She is the bronze medallist of the 2017 Judo Grand Prix Hohhot in the +78 kg category.

References

External links
 

1988 births
Living people
Mongolian female judoka
Judoka at the 2014 Asian Games
Judoka at the 2018 Asian Games
21st-century Mongolian women